John J. Hines (born March 3, 1936) is an American rancher and former politician. He served in the Wyoming Senate from 2003 to 2015, representing the 23rd district. Hines previously served in the Wyoming House of Representatives from 1985 to 2002.

Personal life
John J. Hines is of Irish descent. His grandfather, also John Hines, was born in Louisville, Kentucky, and raised in a Pennsylvania orphanage. John Hines settled in Wyoming in 1900, and died in 1930. Hines's only son, John Dwight Hines, operated the family ranch and married Annie McKenzie two years after his father's death. The couple raised four children, including John J. John Dwight died in 1952, and his wife ran the ranch until 1960, when John J. acquired it. John J. Hines raised sheep, and since 2009, cattle, on his ranch.

References

1936 births
Living people
Presidents of the Wyoming Senate
Republican Party Wyoming state senators
Republican Party members of the Wyoming House of Representatives
University of Wyoming alumni
21st-century American politicians
20th-century American politicians
Ranchers from Wyoming
American people of Irish descent
People from Gillette, Wyoming